This is a list of law enforcement agencies in the Commonwealth of Massachusetts.

According to the US Bureau of Justice Statistics' 2008 Census of State and Local Law Enforcement Agencies, the state had 357 law enforcement agencies employing 18,342 sworn police officers, about 280 for each 100,000 residents.

Federal Agencies 

These are federal agencies that have common operations within the state.

Administrative Office of the United States Courts, Office of Probation and Pretrial Services
Amtrak Police Department
Bureau of Alcohol, Tobacco, Firearms and Explosives
Bureau of Industry and Security, Office of Export Enforcement
Department of the Air Force Police
Department of the Navy Police
Drug Enforcement Administration
Federal Air Marshal Service
Federal Bureau of Investigation
Federal Bureau of Prisons
Federal Protective Service
Internal Revenue Service, Criminal Investigations Division
National Aeronautics and Space Administration, Protective Services
National Oceanic and Atmospheric Administration Office of Law Enforcement
National Park Service
National Nuclear and Security Administration, Office of Secure Transport
United States Air Force Office of Special Investigations
United States Air Force Security Forces
United States Army Military Police
United States Coast Guard
United States Customs and Border Protection
United States Department of Veterans Affairs Police
United States Diplomatic Security Service
United States Environmental Protection Agency Criminal Investigation Division
United States Food and Drug Administration Office of Criminal Investigations
United States Immigration and Customs Enforcement
United States Marine Corps Criminal Investigation Division
United States Marine Corps Military Police
United States Marine Corps Police
United States Marshal Service
United States Naval Criminal Investigative Service
United States Navy Master-at-Arms
United States Postal Inspection Service

State agencies 
 Office of the Treasurer and Receiver General of Massachusetts
 Alcoholic Beverages Control Commission
 Enforcement Division 
 Massachusetts Attorney General's Office
 Massachusetts Executive Office of Energy and Environmental Affairs
 Massachusetts Environmental Police
 Massachusetts Executive Office of Public Safety and Security
 Massachusetts State Police
 Massachusetts Department of Correction
 Massachusetts Court System
 Executive Office of the Trial Court 
 Trial Court Security Department

County agencies 

 Barnstable County Sheriff's Office
 Berkshire County Sheriff's Office
 Bristol County Sheriff's Office
 Dukes County Sheriff's Office
 Essex County Sheriff's Office
 Franklin County Sheriff's Office
 Hampden County Sheriff's Office
 Hampshire County Sheriff's Office
 Middlesex County Sheriff's Office
 Nantucket County Sheriff's Office
 Norfolk County Sheriff's Office
 Plymouth County Sheriff's Office
 Suffolk County Sheriff's Department
 Worcester County Sheriff's Office

Municipal agencies 

 Abington Police Department
 Acton Police Department 
 Acushnet Police Department
 Adams Police Department
 Agawam Police Department
 Alford Police Department
 Andover Police Department
 Amesbury Police Department
 Amherst Police Department
 Arlington Police Department
 Ashburnham Police Department
 Ashby Police Department
 Ashfield Police Department
 Ashland Police Department
 Aquinnah Police Department
 Athol Police Department 
 Attleboro Police Department
 Auburn Police Department 
 Avon Police Department
 Ayer Police Department
 Barnstable Police Department
 Barre Police Department
 Becket Police Department
 Bedford Police Department
 Belchertown Police Department
 Bellingham Police Department
 Belmont Police Department 
 Berkley Police Department
 Berlin Police Department
 Bernardston Police Department
 Beverly Police Department
 Billerica Police Department
 Blackstone Police Department
 Blandford Police Department
 Bolton Police Department
 Boston Police Department
 Bourne Police Department
 Boxborough Police Department
 Boxford Police Department
 Boylston Police Department
 Braintree Police Department
 Brewster Police Department
 Bridgewater Police Department
 Brimfield Police Department
 Brockton Police Department
 Brookfield Police Department
 Brookline Police Department
 Buckland Police Department
 Burlington Police Department
 Cambridge Police Department
 Canton Police Department
 Carlisle Police Department
 Carver Police Department
 Charlemont Police Department
 Charlton Police Department
 Chatham Police Department
 Chelmsford Police Department
 Chelsea Police Department
 Cheshire Police Department
 Chester Police Department
 Chesterfield Police Department
 Chicopee Police Department
 Chilmark Police Department
 Clarksburg Police Department
 Clinton Police Department
 Cohasset Police Department
 Colrain Police Department
 Concord Police Department
 Conway Police Department
 Cummington Police Department
 Dalton Police Department
 Danvers Police Department
 Dartmouth Police Department
 Dedham Police Department
 Deerfield Police Department
 Dennis Police Department
 Dighton Police Department
 Douglas Police Department
 Dover Police Department
 Dracut Police Department
 Dudley Police Department
 Dunstable Police Department
 Duxbury Police Department
 East Bridgewater Police Department
 East Brookfield Police Department
 East Longmeadow Police Department
 Eastham Police Department
 Easthampton Police Department
 Easton Police Department
 Edgartown Police Department
 Egremont Police Department
 Erving Police Department
 Essex Police Department
 Everett Police Department
 Fairhaven Police Department
 Fall River Police Department
 Falmouth Police Department
 Fitchburg Police Department
 Foxborough Police Department
 Framingham Police Department
 Franklin Police Department
 Freetown Police Department
 Gardner Police Department
 Georgetown Police Department
 Gill Police Department
 Gloucester Police Department
 Goshen Police Department
 Gosnold Police Department
 Grafton Police Department
 Granby Police Department
 Granville Police Department
 Great Barrington Police Department
 Greenfield Police Department
 Groton Police Department
 Hadley Police Department
 Halifax Police Department
 Hamilton Police Department
 Hampden Police Department
 Hancock Police Department
 Hanover Police Department
 Hanson Police Department
 Hardwick Police Department
 Harvard Police Department
 Harwich Police Department
 Hatfield Police Department
 Haverhill Police Department
 Hawley Police Department
 Heath Police Department
 Hingham Police Department
 Hinsdale Police Department
 Holbrook Police Department
 Holden Police Department
 Holland Police Department
 Holliston Police Department
 Holyoke Police Department
 Hopedale Police Department
 Hopkinton Police Department
 Hubbardston Police Department
 Hudson Police Department
 Hull Police Department
 Huntington Police Department
 Ipswich Police Department
 Kingston Police Department
 Lancaster Police Department
 Lanesborough Police Department
 Lakeville Police Department
 Lawrence Police Department
 Lee Police Department
 Leicester Police Department
 Lenox Police Department
 Leominster Police Department
 Leverett Police Department
 Lexington Police Department
 Leyden Police Department
 Lincoln Police Department
 Littleton Police Department
 Longmeadow Police Department
 Lowell Police Department
 Ludlow Police Department
 Lunnenburg Police Department
 Lynn Police Department
 Lynnfield Police Department
 Malden Police Department
 Manchester-by-the-Sea Police Department
 Mansfield Police Department
 Marion Police Department
 Marblehead Police Department
 Marlborough Police Department
 Marshfield Police Department
 Mashpee Police Department
 Mattapoisett Police Department
 Maynard Police Department
 Medfield Police Department
 Medford Police Department
 Medway Police Department
 Melrose Police Department
 Mendon Police Department
 Merrimac Police Department
 Methuen Police Department
 Middleborough Police Department
 Middlefield Police Department
 Middleton Police Department
 Milford Police Department
 Millbury Police Department
 Millis Police Department
 Milleville Police Department
 Milton Police Department
 Monson Police Department
 Montague Police Department
 Monterey Police Department
 Nahant Police Department
 Nantucket Police Department
 Natick Police Department
 Needham Police Department
 New Bedford Police Department
 New Braintree Police Department
 New Marlborough Police Department
 New Salem Police Department
 Newbury Police Department
 Newburyport Police Department
 Newton Police Department
 Norfolk Police Department
 North Adams Police Department
 North Andover Police Department
 North Attleborough Police Department
 North Brookfield Police Department
 North Reading Police Department
 Northampton Police Department
 Northborough Police Department
 Northbridge Police Department
 Northfield Police Department
 Norton Police Department
 Norwell Police Department
 Norwood Police Department
 Oak Bluffs Police Department
 Oakham Police Department
 Orange Police Department
 Orleans Police Department
 Otis Police Department
 Oxford Police Department
 Palmer Police Department
 Paxton Police Department
 Peabody Police Department
 Pepperell Police Department
 Pelham Police Department
 Pembroke Police Department
 Peru Police Department
 Petersham Police Department
 Phillipston Police Department
 Pittsfield Police Department
 Plainfield Police Department
 Plainville Police Department
 Plymouth Police Department
 Plympton Police Department
 Princeton Police Department
 Provincetown Police Department
 Quincy Police Department
 Raynham Police Department
 Randolph Police Department
 Reading Police Department
 Rehoboth Police Department
 Revere Police Department
 Richmond Police Department
 Rochester Police Department
 Rockland Police Department
 Rockport Police Department
 Rowe Police Department
 Rowley Police Department
 Royalston Police Department
 Russell Police Department
 Rutland Police Department
 Salem Police Department
 Salisbury Police Department
 Sandisfield Police Department
 Sandwich Police Department
 Saugus Police Department
 Savoy Police Department
 Scituate Police Department
 Seekonk Police Department
 Sharon Police Department
 Sheffield Police Department
 Shelburne Police Department
 Sherborne Police Department
 Shirley Police Department
 Shrewsbury Police Department
 Shutesbury Police Department
 Somerset Police Department
 Somerville Police Department
 South Hadley Police Department
 Southborough Police Department
 Southbridge Police Department
 Southampton Police Department
 Southwick Police Department
 Spencer Police Department
 Springfield Police Department
 Sterling Police Department
 Stockbridge Police Department
 Stoneham Police Department
 Stoughton Police Department
 Stow Police Department
 Sturbridge Police Department
 Sudbury Police Department
 Sutton Police Department
 Swansea Police Department
 Swampscott Police Department
 Taunton Police Department
 Templeton Police Department
 Tewksbury Police Department
 Tisbury Police Department
 Tolland Police Department
 Topsfield Police Department
 Townsend Police Department
 Truro Police Department
 Tynsborough Police Department
 Tyringham Police Department
 Upton Police Department
 Uxbridge Police Department
 Wakefield Police Department
 Wales Police Department
 Walpole Police Department
 Waltham Police Department
 Ware Police Department
 Wareham Police Department
 Warren Police Department
 Warwick Police Department
 Washington Police Department
 Watertown Police Department
 Wayland Police Department
 Webster Police Department
 Wellesley Police Department 
 Wellfleet Police Department
 Wendell Police Department
 Wenham Police Department
 West Boylston Police Department
 West Bridgewater Police Department
 West Brookfield Police Department
 West Newbury Police Department
 West Springfield Police Department
 West Stockbridge Police Department
 West Tisbury Police Department
 Westborough Police Department
 Westhampton Police Department
 Westfield Police Department
 Westford Police Department
 Westminster Police Department
 Westport Police Department
 Weston Police Department
 Westwood Police Department
 Weymouth Police Department
 Whately Police Department
 Whitman Police Department
 Wilbraham Police Department
 Williamsburg Police Department
 Williamstown Police Department
 Wilmington Police Department
 Winchendon Police Department
 Winchester Police Department
 Windsor Police Department
 Winthrop Police Department
 Woburn Police Department
 Worcester Police Department
 Worthington Police Department
 Wrentham Police Department
 Yarmouth Police Department

Other agencies 

Animal Rescue League of Boston Law Enforcement Services
Boston Housing Authority Police Division
Boston Municipal Protective Services
Boston Park Rangers
Boston Public Health Commission Police
 Boston School Police
Beth Israel Deaconess Medical Center Public Safety Department
Boston Medical Center Public Safety Department
Brigham and Women’s Hospital Public Safety
Cambridge Health Alliance Department of Public Safety
Holyoke Medical Center Security
 Mashpee Wampanoag Police Department 
 Massachusetts Bay Transportation Authority Police
 Massachusetts General Hospital Police, Security and Outside Services Department
 Massachusetts Port Authority Police
 Massachusetts Society for the Prevention of Cruelty to Animals Law Enforcement
 Newton-Wellesley Hospital Parking and Public Safety Department
 Saint Elizabeth’s Medical Center Safety and Security Department
 Saint Vincent Hospital Police Department
 Springfield Park Rangers
 Tufts Medical Center Public Safety
 UMass Memorial Medical Center Police

College and university agencies 

 American International College Police Department
 Amherst College Police Department
 Assumption College Department of Public Safety
 Babson College Department of Public Safety
 Bay Path University Department of Campus Public Safety
 Becker College Police Department
 Bentley University Police Department
 Berklee Public Safety Department
 Boston College Police Department
 Boston University Police Department
 Brandeis University Police Department
 Bridgewater State University Police Department
 Bristol Community College Police Department
 Bunker Hill Community College Police Department
 Cape Cod Community College Police Department
 Clark University Police Department
 Curry College Department of Public Safety
 College of the Holy Cross Public Safety
 Emerson College Police Department
 Fisher College Police Department
 Fitchburg State University Police Department
 Framingham State University Police Department
 Greenfield Community College Office of Public Safety
 Harvard University Police Department
 Holyoke Community College Police Department
 Lasell College Police Department
 Massachusetts Bay Community College Campus Police Department
 Massachusetts College of Art & Design Police Department
 Massachusetts College of Liberal Arts Department of Public Safety
 Massachusetts Institute of Technology Police Department
 Massasoit Community College Police Department
 Massachusetts College of Pharmacy and Health Services Public Safety Department
 Merrimack College Police Department
 Middlesex County College Police Department
 Mount Holyoke College Campus Police Department
 Mount Wachusett Community College Campus Police Department
 Northeastern University Police Department
 North Shore Community College Campus Police Department
 Quinsigamond Community College Police Department
 Salem State University Police Department
 Simmons University Police Department
 Smith College Campus Police Department
 Springfield College Department of Public Safety
 Springfield Technical Community College Police Department
 Stonehill College Police Department
 Suffolk University Police and Security Department
 Tufts University Police Department
 University of Massachusetts, Amherst Police Department
 University of Massachusetts, Boston Police Department
 University of Massachusetts, Dartmouth Police Department
 University of Massachusetts, Lowell Police Department
 University of Massachusetts Chan Medical School Police Department
 Wellesley College Campus Police Department
 Wentworth Institute of Technology Public Safety Department
 Western New England University Department of Public Safety
 Westfield State University Police Department
 Wheaton College Public Safety Department
 Worcester Polytechnic Institute Police Department
 Worcester State University Police Department

References

See also 
 List of defunct law enforcement agencies of Massachusetts

Massachusetts
 
Law enforcement agencies